Ainy Jaffri Rahman is a Pakistani actress and model.

Career 
Ainy initially started her career at an advertising company, . Later on when she came to Pakistan she started working in drama serials.

She made her television debut with AAG TV's teen drama, Dreamers . She then followed it with the drama serial Zip Bus Chup Raho in 2011, which was telecast on Geo TV. In 2012, Jaffri appeared in a lead role in Hum TV's program Aseerzadi. In 2013, she made her film debut in Humayun Saeed's production Main Hoon Shahid Afridi. Ainy Jaffri has also voiced the main character Jiya in the animated series, Burka Avenger. She also appeared in the 2017 film Balu Mahi with Osman Khalid Butt, a film by Haissam Hussain. In 2018, she appeared in the drama serial Tajdeed e Wafa on Hum TV.

In October 2022, it was announced that she will make her television comeback after a four-year hiatus, with her role in an upcoming web series Mandi.

Personal life
Jaffri married Faris Rahman on 22 February 2014.

Filmography

Drama serials

Films

See also
 List of Pakistani actresses

References 

Pakistani television actresses
Pakistani female models
Actresses from Karachi
Living people
Pakistani voice actresses
Pakistani film actresses
21st-century Pakistani actresses
Pakistani twins
1981 births